Thomas Lund (born September 13, 1974 in Copenhagen, Denmark) is the head master of The Royal Danish School of Ballet in Copenhagen.
Lund admitted to The Royal Danish School of Ballet in 1986 aged 11. He became apprentice in 1991, member of the corps de ballet of The Royal Danish Ballet in 1993, soloist in 1996 and was appointed principal dancer in 2000. In September 2012 Lund retired as a Principal Dancer to become the head master of The Royal Danish School of Ballet He held that position until June 2022.

Lund is also a ballet master and a teacher at The Royal Danish Ballet, and he teaches at Bournonville seminars around the world. Since 2011 Lund has been staging Harald Lander's ballets Études around the world. 

Lund was knighted the Order of the Dannebrog in 2006, Knight 1st Class of the Order of the Dannebrog in 2011, and Commander of the Order of the Dannebrog in 2022 by Her Majesty the Queen of Denmark.

The Bournonville Repertoire
Lund is a Bournonville dancer whose roles have included James in La Sylphide, Gennaro in Napoli, Carelis and Geert in The Kermesse in Bruges, the title role in Abdallah, the Ballet Master in Le Conservatoire, the Pas de Deux of The Flower Festival in Genzano, Otto in The King's Volunteers on Amager, Pas de Sept in A Folk Tale, Jockey Dance and Wilhelm Tell.

Principal appearances at the Royal Danish Theatre
Other important roles has included Prince in Peter Martins' "Swan Lake", the Prince in Alexei Ratmansky's The Nutcracker, Puck in John Neumeier's A Midsummer Night's Dream, Mercutio and Benvolio in John Neumeier's Romeo and Juliet, Harald Lander's ballets Études and Festpolonaisen, Bim in Maurice Béjart's Gaité Parisienne; King Christian VII in Flemming Flindt's Caroline Mathilde, the Teacher in Flindt's "The Lesson", Jerome Robbins’ Tarantella and Fancy Free, George Balanchine's Symphony in C (3rd movement) and  Jewels (2nd movement, Rubies), Peter Martins' Zakouski and as Lensky in Onegin.

Principal soloist appearances
Peasant Pas de Deux in Giselle, Le Corsaire, Shy boy in Jerome Robbins' The Concert, the Bluebird Pas de Deux in The Sleeping Beauty, Benno, the Jester, Russian Das de Deux & Pas de Quartre in Peter Martins' Swan Lake, Ulysses Dove's Dancing on the Front Porch of Heaven, twin in Neumeier's The Odyssey, William Forsythe's In the Middle, Somewhat Elevated, Drummer in David Lichine's Graduation Ball, Land, Jirí Kylián's Return to a Strange Land, Serge Lifar's Suite en Blanc, Martins' ballets Ash, Fearful Symmetries, The Waltz Project and Jazz.

Creations at RDB for Thomas Lund
Silk and Knife by Jirí Kylián, Earth by Jorma Uotinen, In Search of... by Pär Isberg, Octet by Peter Martins, the Prince in The Nutcracker by Alexei Ratmansky, Ballads Enclosed - for Ayla by Kevin O'Day, Sense of Spring and Concerto in Pieces by Lila York, Turandot's Dream by Alexei Ratmansky, the principal part in All ye need to know by Lar Lubovitch, Quasi una Fantasia and Symphony and Transformation by Anna Lærkesen, Swan Lake by Peter Martins, Horatio in Hamlet by Peter Schaufuss, and Inside Party by Kenneth Kreutzmann.

Other important assignments
Gala performances in Europe and the USA. The Flower Festival in Genzano with the New York City Ballet, USA; James in La Sylphide at Teatro dell’Opera, Rome, Frants in Coppélia at the Pacific Northwest Ballet, Seattle, USA, guest performance at the Operetta Theatre, Moscow, The Flower Festival in Genzano and Napoli, 3rd Act at MEB Hall, Ankara, Turkey; the Prince in The Nutcracker, Inoue Ballet, Tokyo, Japan; Zakouski and The Flower Festival in Genzano at the 7th International Ballet Festival in Riga, guest performer with Twyla Tharp Dance in the creation Diabelli in Paris and London, Tim Rushton's Carmina Burana at the Marie Brolin Tanis Dansekompagni, Aarhus, Denmark and together with the group Principals and Soloists from the Royal Danish Ballet Lund has been touring South America, South Africa, USA, Italy, Malta.
In 2005 Lund was the artistic director of Principals and Soloists of the Royal Danish Ballet's critically acclaimed performances at Sadler's Wells Theatre in London, England.

When the Royal Danish Ballet in 2005 released the documentation of the six Bournonville Schools on DVD Thomas Lund was involved in the project right from the beginning both as an instructor and as a dancer.

Principal awards
In 2006 Thomas Lund was given the prestigious Reumert Lifetime Achievement Award. In 2005 Lund was first named Tänzer des Jahres by the German dance magasin Ballettanz, and later the same year The Critics’ Circle National Dance Awards made him Best Male Dancer 2005. Other awards include The 2004 Danish Reumert Theatre Award for Dancer of the Year, Leonid Massine Premio Positano per l'Arte della Danza 2001, the 2001 Pegasus Award as Artist of the Year at the Spoleto Festival dei Due Mondi, the 1998 DANCE Award, the Bournonville Award, and the Award of the Foundation of HRH the Prince Consort in 1998.

Additional information
At the Royal Danish Ballet Lund staged Le Conservatoire and worked on Napoli as assistant director.
He featured a new rendition of the 2nd act of Napoli entitled A Second Act. Other creations include Relations, Hands of Love (performed in concert with Die Herren at Vega, Copenhagen) as well as at the Choreographer's Workshop. 
He is teacher at the Royal Danish Ballet and has formerly taught at the school of ballet in Hiroshima and has worked as a trainer at the New York International Competition. He has also been assigned as visiting teacher at the New York City Ballet and Twyla Tharp Dance.
Thomas Lund has furthermore played the piano since he was 7 and plays the keyboard in the Royal Danish Ballet rock band. 

In 2007 Lund collaborated with ballet- and art-historian Ole Nørlyng on the book Danseglæde og springkraft - 16 spor til dansen, using Lund's own story as a basis for a wide-ranging look at the world of ballet.
From the book:'You don't know how you look on stage, but if what you're doing reads clearly it means you have to try to be quite honest, because otherwise it shows. You have to be very aware of how you work with yourself - it all comes from what you feel at that moment. When I do James, for instance, I actually say the lines to myself as I'm doing the mime. Not always, but... you have to have the overall feeling at that moment, in that scene; and then one scene leads into the next, and sometimes, if for instance in La Sylphide or Napoli something doesn't go how I want during the first act, then when I'm up in my dressing room in the intermission I try to work out what I felt, and what do I need to do now, to get it in a way so it still works. That way you don't always do it the same way - what I'm doing on Friday might be a little different from last night because suddenly things fall out a little differently in the first act. So I need the intermission to reflect. And this is what I think is so wonderful about the Royal Danish Ballet, that we work so strongly with the tradition of acting, and that is probably why I'm still here, that I get from our repertory the opportunity of going back to these parts and developing.   (Translation by Jane Simpson)
To celebrate the bicentenary of the birth of August Bournonville, the Danish Postal Service - Post Danmark - issuied on 4 May 2005 two commemorative postage stamps. On the DKK 4.50 stamp Lund was the silhouette performing the characteristic Bournonville leap, Grand Jeté, in Bournonville's ballet Napoli.

External links
The Royal Danish Ballet 
Bournonville
Thomas Lund's homepage
Jane Simpson's interview with Lund, 2007 

Danish male ballet dancers
Royal Danish Ballet principal dancers
National Dance Award winners
Living people
1974 births